Overall performance of São Tomé and Príncipe in the Lusophone Games.

Medal table by sports

Participation by year 
 2006
 2009

References

Nations at the Lusofonia Games